This is a list of indoor arenas in the United Kingdom with an indoor seating capacity of at least 5,000, regardless of usage.

Constructed

England

Northern Ireland

Scotland

Wales

Under construction

Proposed

Former / demolished

See also
List of indoor arenas in Europe
List of indoor arenas by capacity
List of British stadiums by capacity
List of venues in the United Kingdom

References

 
United Kingdom
Indoor arenas
Indoor arenas